Littlest Pet Shop is an animated television series based on the toy franchise Littlest Pet Shop released by Kenner Products. The series debuted on October 16, 1995 in the United States and syndicated to local stations by distributor Claster Television. It was produced by Sunbow Entertainment in the United States, and Créativité & Développement and AB Productions in France.

Plot
Littlest Pet Shop follows the lives of five miniature animals who live in a pet shop on Littlest Lane and have their own treehouse inside of the store.

Characters

Main
 Stu (voiced by Michael Donovan) - A blue dog with a bumbling personality who happens to be a big eater. His name is pun on stew.
 Chloe (voiced by Babs Chula) - A sarcastic purple cat who has been reincarnated many times with her first life being in Ancient Egypt.
 Viv (voiced by Lynda Boyd in a British accent) - A music-loving pink rabbit who sings and dances. She has a backing band that lives in her top hat.
 Chet (voiced by Lee Tockar) - A macho yellow horse who acts like a cowboy. His name is pun on the slang term Chad.
 Squeaks (vocal effects provided by Ted Cole) - A red monkey who loves bananas and speaks in monkey language that the other characters understand.

Recurring
 Elwood P. Harvey (voiced by Ian James Corlett) - A man who runs the pet shop. His name and appearance are a reference to the movie Harvey.
 Delilah (voiced by Shirley Millner) - A normal-sized monitor lizard who plots to eat the pets and is owned by Elwood.
 Harriet - A parrot who often joins the main pets.
 Rookie (voiced by Sarah Strange) - A brown puppy who lives in the pet shop.
 Sergeant Butch Kowalski (voiced by Garry Chalk) - A green militaristic hamster.
 Bernice - A hamster and Butch's love interest.
 Mumsy (voiced by Kathleen Barr) - An archaeologist and explorer who is Elwood's mother.

Episodes

Production
Littlest Pet Shop was animated by AKOM in South Korea, KK C&D Asia in Japan, and Wang Film Productions in Taiwan.

Broadcast
Littlest Pet Shop was syndicated to local stations in the United States. The series was also broadcast on Tiny Pop and CBBC in the United Kingdom.

Home media releases
In 1996, Family Home Entertainment released the show on four VHS cassettes each containing 2 to 4 episodes. The Christmas video entitled Do Not Solve Until Christmas (which contains "Do Not Solve Until Christmas" and "Who Scrooged McRude?") was released as part of the Family Home Entertainment Christmas Classics series.

References

External links

Littlest Pet Shop
1990s American animated television series
1990s Canadian animated television series
1990s French animated television series
1995 American television series debuts
1995 American television series endings
1995 Canadian television series debuts
1995 Canadian television series endings
1995 French television series debuts
1995 French television series endings
American children's animated comedy television series
Canadian children's animated comedy television series
French children's animated comedy television series
English-language television shows
First-run syndicated television programs in the United States
Television shows based on Hasbro toys
Television series by Sunbow Entertainment
Television series by Claster Television